Bijoux Creek is a small river in the Hart Ranges of the Northern Rockies of British Columbia.

Named in 1954 by Frank Clapp, Department of Highways for the sparkling jewel like water.  The creek is well known for the 40m high Bijoux Falls.

On November 28th, 2020 a snowmobiler was killed in an avalanche which occurred near the source of Bijoux Creek.

References 

Rivers of British Columbia
Cariboo Land District